Jagpreet Singh commonly known as Jaggi Singh is an Indian actor and film producer. Jaggi known for his role in Punjabi film Faraar as Kaptaan. His role in Faraar earned him the recognition as a future villain of Punjabi Cinema. He made his acting debut in 2012 movie, Mirza The Untold Story and which he followed with Hero Naam Yaad Rakhi, Faraar, Manje Bistre

References

External links

Living people
21st-century Indian male actors
Male actors in Punjabi cinema
1989 births